The Sundowners is a 1950 American Technicolor Western film directed by George Templeton, starring Robert Preston and featuring John Drew Barrymore (billed as John Barrymore, Jr.), Robert Sterling, Chill Wills, and Jack Elam. The film is also known as Thunder in the Dust in the United Kingdom.

Plot
A rash of cattle rustling leads to a range war, centered on the disputed grazing rights to a fertile canyon. Hostilities escalate with the arrival of a gunman, who disrupts both sides in the conflict.

Cast 
A 1950 film review lists the cast as follows:
Robert Preston as James Cloud ('Kid Wichita')
Robert Sterling as Tom Cloud
John Drew Barrymore (in his film debut) as Jeff Cloud
Chill Wills as Sam Beers
Cathy Downs as Kathleen Boyce
John Litel as John Gall
Jack Elam as Earl Boyce
Don Haggerty as Elmer Gall
Stanley Price as Steve Fletcher
Clem Fuller as Turkey
Frank Cordell as Jim Strake
Dave Kashner as Gill Batson

Soundtrack 
"O'Riley" (Written by Alberto Colombo)

References

External links 
 

1950 films
1950 Western (genre) films
Eagle-Lion Films films
American Western (genre) films
1950s English-language films
1950s American films